Friedrich Sieburg (1893–1964) was a German journalist.
He was born in Altena and died in Gärtringen.

Selected works 

 Gott in Frankreich? Societäts-Verlag, Frankfurt 1929 (französische Übersetzung Dieu est-il français? 1930) 
 Frankreichs rote Kinder. Societäts-Verlag, 1931; 2. Aufl. Wunderlich, Tübingen 1949
 Es werde Deutschland. Societäts-Verlag 1933
 Polen, Legende und Wirklichkeit. Societäts-Verlag 1934
 Robespierre. Societäts-Verlag 1935
 Afrikanischer Frühling. Eine Reise. Societäts-Verlag 1938
 Blick durchs Fenster. Aus 10 Jahren Frankreich und England. Societäts-Verlag 1939
 Die stählerne Blume. Eine Reise nach Japan. Societäts-Verlag 1939
 La fleur d'acier (Voyage au Japon). Grasset, Paris 1942
 Schwarzweiße Magie. Über die Freiheit der Presse, Wunderlich, Tübingen 1949
 Unsere schönsten Jahre. Ein Leben mit Paris. Wunderlich 1950
 Was nie verstummt. Begegnungen. Wunderlich 1951
 Geliebte Ferne. Der schönsten Jahre anderer Teil. Wunderlich 1952
 Die Lust am Untergang. Selbstgespräche auf Bundesebene. Rowohlt 1954; wieder: Eichborn 2010 
 Napoleon. Die hundert Tage. Deutsche Verlagsanstalt DVA, Stuttgart 1956
 Chateaubriand. Romantik und Politik. DVA 1959
 Das Geld des Königs. Eine Studie über Colbert. Deutsche Verlagsanstalt, Stuttgart 1960
 Lauter letzte Tage. Prosa aus zehn Jahren. Deutsche Verlagsanstalt, Stuttgart 1961
 Napoleon: Die 100 Tage. Ullstein 1987, 
 Abmarsch in die Barbarei. Gedanken über Deutschland. Hg. Klaus Harpprecht, DVA 1983
 Zur Literatur: 1924–1956. Hrsg. Fritz Raddatz, Ullstein 1987 
 Zur Literatur: 1957–1963. Hrsg. Fritz Raddatz, Ullstein 1987

Literatur 

 Zimmermann, Harro: Friedrich Sieburg – Ästhet und Provokateur. Eine Biographie. Wallstein, Göttingen 2015, .
 Deinet, Klaus: Friedrich Sieburg (1893–1964). Ein Leben zwischen Frankreich und Deutschland. NoRa Verlag, Berlin 2014, .
 Buddenbrock, Cecilia: Friedrich Sieburg 1893–1964. Ein deutscher Journalist vor der Herausforderung eines Jahrhunderts. Societät, Frankfurt 2007. .
 Erstfassung in französischer Sprache: F. S. 1893–1964. Un journaliste allemand à l'épreuve du siècle. Éditions de Paris, Paris 2005, .
 
 Peter Longerich: Propagandisten im Krieg. Die Presseabteilung des Auswärtigen Amtes unter Ribbentrop. Oldenbourg, München 1987, .
 Joachim Fest: Friedrich Sieburg. Ein Portrait ohne Anlass. In: Ders.: Aufgehobene Vergangenheit. Portraits und Betrachtungen. Deutsche Verlags-Anstalt, Stuttgart 1981, S. 70–95.

Selected filmography
 City in View (1923)

References

1893 births
1964 deaths
German male journalists
German male writers
Recipients of the Order of Merit of the Federal Republic of Germany
20th-century German journalists